Blake Broszus (born 22 November 2000) is a Canadian fencer. He competed in the men's team foil event at the 2020 Summer Olympics.

References

External links
 
 Penn Quakers bio

2000 births
Living people
Canadian male fencers
Olympic fencers of Canada
Fencers at the 2020 Summer Olympics
Place of birth missing (living people)
Sportspeople from Santa Clara, California
Sportspeople from San Jose, California
Penn Quakers fencers